is a Japanese badminton player, who is a singles specialist from Nara Prefecture, Japan. In 2008, she won the Portugal and Croatian International tournaments in the women's singles event.

Achievements

BWF Grand Prix 
The BWF Grand Prix has two level, the Grand Prix and Grand Prix Gold. It is a series of badminton tournaments sanctioned by the Badminton World Federation (BWF) since 2007.

Women's singles

 BWF Grand Prix Gold tournament
 BWF Grand Prix tournament

BWF International Challenge/Series
Women's singles

 BWF International Challenge tournament
 BWF International Series tournament

References

External links 
 

Living people
1986 births
Sportspeople from Nara Prefecture
Japanese female badminton players
21st-century Japanese women